Lenny Lyles (January 26, 1936 – November 20, 2011) was a professional American football cornerback who played 12 seasons in the National Football League (NFL). He started in Super Bowl III for the Baltimore Colts. The 6–2, 202-pound Lyles was recruited by the University of Louisville in 1954, when he broke the school's color barrier for scholarship athletes. Lyles remains Louisville's all-time scoring leader for a non-kicker with 300 points. After a successful collegiate career, where Lyles was known for his return skills, he was drafted by the Baltimore Colts in the first round of the 1958 NFL Draft. He spent one year with the Colts before joining the 49ers in 1959. After two seasons in San Francisco, Lyles returned to the Colts where he remained until the end of his career in 1969. Lyles finished his professional career with 2,161 return yards and averaged 26.7 yards per return. Lyles spent 27 years as an executive with Brown & Williamson in Louisville.

References

1936 births
2011 deaths
Players of American football from Louisville, Kentucky
Players of American football from Nashville, Tennessee
American football defensive backs
Central High School (Louisville, Kentucky) alumni
Louisville Cardinals football players
Baltimore Colts players
San Francisco 49ers players
Western Conference Pro Bowl players